The West Flanders Tribes was a Belgian American football team based in the province of West-Flanders, with two home cities, Ostend and Izegem. The Tribes were members of the Flemish American Football League (FFL) conference in the Belgian Football League (BFL). Their team colours are maroon, white and black. In 2012, the team split up into the Ostend Pirates and the Izegem Tribes.

History

1990
In 1990 the Izegem Redskins were formed by Rudy Dewaegemaeker after his old team, the Moeskroen Redskins, was disbanded. After a couple of months of practice the Redskins played their first game against the Brussel Raiders. The Raiders, led by Mike La Salle and QB Jon VandeMergel, beat the Redskins 78-0. The game was stopped in the 3rd quarter. This poor start was a harbinger of years of losses. But the Redskins were a group of friends, crazy about the game of football, so they stuck in there. During the second season they scored their first touchdown, which was celebrated afterwards as if they were World Champions. They won their first game in their fourth season.

1994
In 1994 the other team in the province, the Ostend Tigers, ended play. Players from the Tigers transferred to Izegem to start playing with the Redskins. At the time there were 2 coaches: Frank Daemen and John Vandemergel. After Daemens' tragic death. Luc Verhoest, the quarterback, took over as Offensive coach and John Vandemergel was the Defensive Coach. Vandermergel became president.

In the mid '90s the Redskins started a junior flag team in Izegem, the Redskin Warriors, coached by Andy Vandenbulcke. A junior team was set up in Ostend also, under the name of the Ostend Seminoles. This was the start of the two practice fields for the Izegem Redskins. The team name was then changed to West-Vlaanderen Tribes as an overall organization, with 2 practice squads: Redskins and Seminoles. During games they played under the name Tribes.

1999 - first Bowl appearance
In 1999 the Redskins played the Antwerp Diamonds in Belgian Bowl XII but lost in their first Belgian Bowl appearance with a score of 41-6.

First two Belgian Titles

2000 season

2000 Playoffs

2001 season

2001 Playoffs

2002 season

2002 Playoffs

2003 season

2004 season

2005 season
In 2005 Frans "Harve" Heuvicq took over as head coach. The 2005 season was the last season that the Tribes were beaten on the road. 
Off. Coordinator: Frans Heuvicq / Def. Coordinator : John Vandemergel / Off. Assistant : Frederik George / Def. Assistant : Benedict Verheyen.

Dominating the BFL (2006-2011)
The Tribes have won the last six consecutive Belgian Bowls, setting a European record.
Head coach: Frans Heuvicq / Off. Coordinator : Frederik George / Def. Coordinator : Benedict Verheyen

2006 season
2006 was the last season the Tribes had a loss (at home, none on the road).

2006 Playoffs

2007 season
In 2007 many changes were made to the Operational Board. Due to continuous efforts in youth and improved coaching, the Tribes are now the most successful American Football sport team in the history of Belgium. Every top player is a product of the Tribes youth teams. The Leuven Lions were the last team to play the Tribes and not lose to them, this was a 6-6 tie in week 1 of the 2007 regular season.
Head coach: Frans Heuvicq / Off. Coordinator : Frederik George / Def. Coordinator : Benedict Verheyen

2007 Playoffs

2008 season

2008 Playoffs

2009 season

2009 Playoffs

EFAF  2009 Atlantic Cup
The tribes won the 2009 Atlantic Cup. The tournament took place at Centre Sportif, Rue des Chalets 1, Berchem-Sainte-Agathe. The game field is made of artificial turf (4th generation).

2010 season

 The game on week 3 was rescheduled due to a frozen underground of the gamefield.

2010 Playoffs

2011 season

Pre-season
 Roots 2010 indoor American football tournament
 Champion of the Roots 2010 Arena Football Tournament with 3 wins and 1 tie.

2011 season

Statistics

Performance since 2000

This is an overview of the performance of the Tribes against the teams in the BFL during the BFL regular and post seasons from 2000 until 2011 and the EFAF Atlantic Cup's from 2009 until 2011.

Standings since 2000

Achievements
1999: Runner-up Champion of Belgium (as Izegem Redskins)
2000: Champion of Belgium (as Izegem Redskins)
2001: Champion of Belgium (perfect season 7-0-0) (as Izegem Redskins)
2006: Champion of Belgium and Champion of Flanders
2007: Champion of Belgium and Champion of Flanders (unbeaten season 9-0-1)
2008: Champion of Belgium and Champion of Flanders (perfect season 10-0-0)
2009: Champion of Belgium and Champion of Flanders (perfect season 10-0-0)
2009: Atlantic Cup Champion
2010: Champion of Belgium and Champion of Flanders (perfect season 10-0-0)
2011: Champion of Belgium and Champion of Flanders (perfect season 10-0-0)
2011: Atlantic Cup Runners-up

References

External links
  Official Tribes website
  Official FFL website
 Official BFL website
  Official Belgian Bowl website

American football teams in Belgium
American football teams established in 1989
American football teams disestablished in 2012
1989 establishments in Belgium
2012 disestablishments in Belgium